Gary T. Leavens is an American academic working as a professor of computer science at the University of Central Florida.

Education 
Leavens earned a Bachelor of Science in computer and communication science from the University of Michigan, a Master of Science in computer science from the University of Southern California, and a PhD in philosophy from the Massachusetts Institute of Technology.

Career 
From 1977 to 1984, Leavens worked on the technical staff at Bell Labs. From 1989 until 2007, he was a professor of computer science at Iowa State University. His scholarship focuses on behavioral interface specification languages (BISLs) such as Larch/Smalltalk, Larch/C++, and JML. Leavens was the program chair for 2009 OOPSLA.

References

American computer scientists
University of Central Florida faculty
Living people
Year of birth missing (living people)

University of Michigan alumni
University of Southern California alumni
Massachusetts Institute of Technology alumni
Iowa State University faculty